Orkhan Gurbanli (born on 12 July 1995) is an Azerbaijani football midfielder who plays for Dinamo-Auto Tiraspol, on loan from Ventspils.

Club career
On 17 May 2014, Gurbanli made his debut in the Azerbaijan Premier League for Neftçi Baku match against Simurq.

Honours
Neftçi Baku
Azerbaijan Cup (1): 2013–14

References

External links
 

1995 births
Living people
Association football midfielders
Azerbaijani footballers
Azerbaijani expatriate footballers
Azerbaijan Premier League players
Latvian Higher League players
Moldovan Super Liga players
Neftçi PFK players
BFC Daugavpils players
Sabail FK players
FK Ventspils players
FC Dinamo-Auto Tiraspol players
Azerbaijani expatriate sportspeople in Latvia
Expatriate footballers in Latvia
Azerbaijani expatriate sportspeople in Moldova
Expatriate footballers in Moldova